The Sands Ring Homestead Museum is a historic house located on Main Street in the Town of Cornwall, in Orange County, New York. It was built in 1760 by Nathaniel Sands for his cousin Comfort Sands. Comfort's wife, however, did not want to leave her home on Long Island, so Nathaniel and his family moved in. In 1777, Nathaniel gave the house as a wedding present to his son David and his bride Clementine Hallock. David, a member of the Society of Friends, opened the house to the Quaker community as a meetinghouse until the Quaker Meeting House located at 60 Quaker Avenue opened in 1790. His son David established a store on the site. It was one of the first meeting places of the Cornwall Quakers. Today it is used as museum featuring Colonial-era activities.

It has been a Registered Historic Place since 1996.

References

External links 
Sands Ring Homestead Museum

Houses on the National Register of Historic Places in New York (state)
Houses in Orange County, New York
National Register of Historic Places in Orange County, New York
Houses completed in 1760
Cornwall, New York
Museums in Orange County, New York
Historic house museums in New York (state)